The Monashee Mountains are a mountain range lying mostly in British Columbia, Canada, extending into the U.S. state of Washington. They are a sub-range of the Columbia Mountains. The highest summit is Mount Monashee, which reaches . The name is from the Scottish Gaelic monadh and sìth, meaning "moor" and "peace".

Geography

The Monashee Mountains are limited on the east by the Columbia River and Arrow Lakes, beyond which lie the Selkirk Mountains. They are limited on the west by the upper North Thompson River and the Interior Plateau. The northern end of the range is Canoe Mountain at the south end of the Robson Valley, near of the town of Valemount, British Columbia. The southern extremity of the range is in Washington State, where the Kettle River Range reaches the confluence of the Kettle River and the Columbia, and reaches west to the southern extremity of the Okanagan Highland (spelled Okanogan Highland in the US) just northeast of the confluence of the Okanogan and Columbia rivers at Brewster and Bridgeport, Washington.

The Okanagan Highland and parts of the Shuswap Highland to the west of the main range are technically classified as part of the Monashees, however, they may also be considered part of the Interior Plateau.  The Okanagan Highland lies between the Kettle River and Okanagan Lake, south of the Shuswap River.  Within this area, the small Sawtooth Range lies between the uppermost Shuswap River to the east and Mabel Lake to the west. The portion of the Shuswap Highland south of the North Thompson River to the Okanagan Highland, may also be included.
Major peaks include Hallam Peak and Cranberry Mountain.

Passes
Between Revelstoke and Shuswap Lake, the range is crossed by Highway 1 - the Trans-Canada Highway - and by the mainline of the Canadian Pacific Railway, which run through Eagle Pass. Highway 6 goes over Monashee Pass. The Crowsnest Highway to the south takes the Bonanza Pass. The southern end of the Monashees within Canada is an historically important mining and former industrial area known as the Boundary Country, which is focused around the basin of the lower Kettle River and extends north toward the Midway Range.

Subranges

Anstey Range
Christina Range
Gold Range
Jordan Range
Kettle River Range
Malton Range
Midway Range
Okanagan Highland
Beaverdell Range
Sawtooth Range
Ratchford Range
Rossland Range
Scrip Range
Shuswap Highland
Whatshan Range

Mountains
Source:
Mount Monashee, 	
Hallam Peak,	
Red Mountain (Rossland),	
,   
Dominion Mountain, 
Peak 2892,	        
Mount Odin,	
Gordon Horne Peak,  
Cranberry Mountain,	
The Pinnacles,	
Mount Begbie,      
Mount Copeland,   
Mount Tilley, 
Mount Albreda,

Sources

External links
Bivouac.com Hiking info and images

 
Columbia Mountains
Interior of British Columbia